The Citizen Turned Gentleman (also known as Mamamouchi: Or, The Citizen Turned Gentleman)  is 1672 comedy play by the English writer Edward Ravenscroft. Staged at the Dorset Garden Theatre by the Duke's Company the original cast included James Nokes as Mr Jorden, Philip Cademan as Young Jorden, John Crosby as Mr Cleverwit, Cave Underhill as Sir Simon Softhead, Henry Harris as Trickmore, Samuel Sandford as Cureal, Edward Angel as Maistre Jaques, Mary Betterton as Lucia and Elinor Leigh as Betty Trickmore.

References

Bibliography
 Van Lennep, W. The London Stage, 1660-1800: Volume One, 1660-1700. Southern Illinois University Press, 1960.

1672 plays
West End plays
Restoration comedy
Plays by Edward Ravenscroft